The 1956 Ulster Grand Prix was the fifth round of the 1956 Grand Prix motorcycle racing season. It took place on 9–11 August 1956 at the Dundrod Circuit.

500 cc classification

350 cc classification

250 cc classification

125 cc classification

Sidecar classification

References

Ulster Grand Prix
Ulster
Ulster
Ulster Grand Prix